The deepwater stargazer (Kathetostoma nigrofasciatum) is a fish species in the stargazer family described in 1915.

References 

Uranoscopidae